Helen King may refer to:
Helen King (actress) (born 1972), Canadian actress
Helen King (police officer) (born 1965), British police officer
Helen King (classicist) (active since 1993), British academic
Helen Dean King (1869–1955), American biologist
Helen King (oncologist) (?–2015), South African oncologist and anti-apartheid campaigner